Chenarbarin (also Romanized as Chenārbarīn; also known as Chenal Bari and Chenal Parin) is a village in Saadatabad Rural District, Pariz District, Sirjan County, Kerman Province, Iran. At the 2006 census, its population was 52, in 13 families.

References 

Populated places in Sirjan County